The 2021–22 Mount St. Mary's Mountaineers women's basketball team represented Mount St. Mary's University in the 2021–22 NCAA Division I women's basketball season. The Mountaineers, led by first-year head coach Antoine White, played their home games at Knott Arena in Emmitsburg, Maryland as members of the Northeast Conference.

On May 2, 2022, it was announced that the Mountaineers will join the MAAC on July 1, 2022, leaving the NEC where they had been members since 1989.

They finished the season 16–13 overall, and 11–7 in NEC play to finish in third place.  As the third seed in the NEC tournament they received a bye into the Quarterfinals where they defeated St. Francis.  In the semifinals they defeated fourth seed Wagner to reach the finals where they defeated seventh seed Bryant to earn the tournament title.  The title was the fifth in program history, and second in a row.  They received an automatic bid to the NCAA tournament as tournament champions.  They were seeded as one of the sixteen seeds in the Bridgeport Region.  They played a First Four matchup with Longwood, which they lost to end their season.

Previous season
The Mountaineers finished the season 17–7 overall, and 14–4 in NEC play to finish in first place, and win the regular season championship.  As the first seed in the NEC tournament they defeated Fairleigh Dickinson in the semifinals and Wagner in the Final to earn the tournament title.  The title was the fourth in program history  They received an automatic bid to the NCAA tournament as tournament champions.  They were seeded as one of the sixteen seeds in the HemisFair Regional.  They lost in the first round to second seed Maryland to end their season.

Roster

Schedule and results

Source:

NEC COVID-19 policy provided that if a team could not play a conference game due to COVID-19 issues within its program, the game would be declared a forfeit and the other team would receive a conference win. However, wins related to COVID-19 do not count pursuant to NCAA policy.

|-
!colspan=6 style=| Non-conference regular season

|-
!colspan=6 style=| NEC regular season

|-
!colspan=6 style=| NEC Tournament

|-
!colspan=6 style=| NCAA tournament

Rankings

The Coaches Poll did not release a Week 2 poll and the AP Poll did not release a poll after the NCAA Tournament.

References

Mount St. Mary's Mountaineers women's basketball seasons
Mount St. Mary's Mountaineers
Mount St. Mary's Mountaineers women's basketball team
Mount St. Mary's Mountaineers women's basketball team
Mount St. Mary's